Microphyla nilphamariensis is a species of narrow-mouthed frog. It is found in Bangladesh, India, Nepal, and northern Pakistan.

Description
Microhyla nilphamariensis is a small frog with a narrow, triangular shaped mouth. This frog is morphologically distinct from all other frogs in its genus as it has reduced webbing between toes. The basic dorsal coloration is light brown with a distinct dark brown diamond-shaped marking over the back. The throat and chest are brown, the belly is dull white and the limbs have dark cross bars.

Habitat 
A nocturnal species, it is active when raining and prefers moist environments. Specimens have been observed in a grassy field near ephemeral pools of water.

References 

nilphamariensis
Frogs of Bangladesh
Frogs of India
Amphibians of Nepal
Amphibians of Pakistan
Amphibians described in 2015